A train crash occurred on July 26, 2022 when a Kereta Api Indonesia (KAI) Lokal Merak train crashed into an odong-odong (a vehicle resembling a bus that carries people, most often children, for amusement purposes) at a level crossing in Serang, Banten, Indonesia on Tuesday morning, causing at least one odong-odong to be overturned. At least nine people were killed (including three children) and another 24 were wounded in the crash.

This was also the first fatal accident involving a train colliding with an odong-odong in history.

Accident
A KAI Lokal Merak passenger train travelling to Rangkasbitung crashes with an odong-odong that was obstructing a level crossing from Walantaka to Kragilan at Silebu, Serang, Indonesia. It was reported that it loaded more than 20 people while obstructing the level crossing on purpose. Extensive damage was caused to the rear of the odong-odong.

9 people were killed and 24 were injured. 6 of those killed were women. 3 children were the other fatality.

The crash was partially captured on video by a CCTV.

Investigation
The odong-odong driver may face charges of negligent homicide and causing actual bodily harm by negligence, which carries a penalty of six to twelve years in prison.

Investigators determined that the cause of the accident have been the inattentiveness of the driver, causing their failure to heed the crossing before the crash. He was found to have played loud music during the trip, and at the time they passed the location at the same crossing. It was also determined that the odong-odong was banned from public roads due to safety reasons.

Aftermath
The tragedy was one of a series of multiple-casualty accidents on Indonesia's overcrowded and undermaintained railway system. The director of KAI commented that no gate was installed at the crossing due to the low frequency of trains on the route, while assuring that it would look into the matter.

In addition, prior to this incident, residents had improved the crossing by adding only crossing gates.

References

2022 disasters in Indonesia
2022 in Indonesia
2022 road incidents
Accidents and incidents involving Kereta Api Indonesia
July 2022 events in Asia
July 2022 events in Indonesia
Level crossing incidents in Indonesia
Railway accidents in 2022
Road incidents in Indonesia